Philodendron giganteum is a species of plant in the Araceae family. It is found in the Caribbean and South America. Heinrich Wilhelm Schott first described it in 1856. P. giganteum is thermogenetic and emits a sweet odor.

References

giganteum
Plants described in 1856
Taxa named by Heinrich Wilhelm Schott